Kharian, village situated in Sirsa district, Haryana. It is situated 14 km away from national highway 10(NH-10). The main source of economic growth is agriculture supported by a number of canals flowing through the village.

However, Gram Panchayat Kharian also received a cheque for Rs 10 lakh as prize money for carrying out outstanding development work in the village. The prize was given by Om Prakash Chautala to the former Sarpanch, Ram Kumar Nain.

Demographics
 India census Kharian had a population of 16000. Male population was 8,239 and female population was 7,761.

Geography
It has an average elevation of 188 metres (620 feet).

Climate
Kharian can be classified as tropical desert, arid and hot; which is mainly dry with very hot summers and cold winters except during monsoon season when moist air of oceanic origin penetrate into the district. There are four seasons in a year. The hot weather season starts from mid March until the last week of June, followed by the south- west monsoon which lasts until September. The transition period from September to October forms the post-monsoon season. The winter season starts late in November and remains up to the first week of March.

Religions and communities
Kharian has a number of communities including Jaat, Bairagi, Bhatiwal, Mehta, Nai, and Meghwal. Approximately 80% of the population are Jaats the majority consisting of Nain.This village is known as Nain Gotra for example as Naino Wala Kharian.
Nain(majority), Bander, Niol, chhimpa, Kasnia, Poonia,[jakhar जाखड़] Nandewal and Bhadu (also, Bhadoo) gotras. Among the Mehta are Chawla, Kalra, Raheja, Julah, and Gera.

Most people of Kharian are of the Hindu religion, but there are also followers of the spiritual and philosophical group, Radha Soami Satsang Beas (RSSB).

Kharian has a temple of saint Baba Munganath; one founded by Baba Ramdev Ji; and a Bajrang Bali temple. There is also a branch centre of the RSSB.

Location
Kharian is situated at a distance of 25 kilometers from Sirsa. Kharian is well connected with nearby villages and cities like Hisar by regular bus service run by the Haryana Roadways

Facilities

Schools and teaching institutions
Ch. Devi Lal Library Kharian
Kharian Public School
Govt Primary School
Govt Senior Secondary School
Govt Girls Senior Secondary School
Maa Saraswati play school kharian

Banks
State Bank Of India
Haryana Gramin Bank

References

Villages in Sirsa district